Sandiway is a village in the civil parish of Cuddington, Cheshire, England. It lies to the southeast of and is contiguous with the village of Cuddington.

Sandiway was the birthplace of John Douglas who designed buildings in the centre of Chester, buildings for the Dukes of Westminster and a number of churches in Cheshire.  St John's Church, Sandiway, and its lychgate were designed by Douglas and both are Grade II listed buildings.

Sandiway Golf Club has been used in final qualifying for The Open golf championship and is a venue for regional amateur finals.

The village has one local school, Sandiway Primary School  located on Weaverham Road with an adjacent village car park.

Sandiway is the home of Blakemere Village, which has shops set in and around an Edwardian stable block with cobbled courtyard. The centre has an indoor and outdoor children's play area as well as a restaurant, falconry and craft workshop. 

Sandiway has cross-roads where the A49 crosses the A556 at the Shell service station.

See also
Listed buildings in Cuddington, Cheshire
Oakmere Hall

References

External links

Official website of the village of Cuddington and Sandiway

Cheshire West and Chester
Villages in Cheshire